Philippine News Agency (PNA) is the official news agency of the Philippine government. PNA is under supervision and control of the News and Information Bureau, an attached agency of the Presidential Communications Operations Office. It was established on March 1, 1973, by President Ferdinand Marcos, and currently has its headquarters in Quezon City.

History

Philippine News Service 
The Philippine News Service (PNS) was organized in 1950 as a news-gathering cooperative by the publishers of the then major and leading national newspapers: the Manila Times-Mirror-Taliba, Manila Chronicle, Manila Bulletin, Philippines Herald, Evening News, Bagong Buhay, and The Fookien Times. Its main function back then was to supply daily news and photos from the provinces to these newspapers as well as to those in the provinces.

Radio and television stations also used the PNS stories for a fixed monthly fee or subscription. Foreign news agencies, such as the Associated Press, United Press International, Reuters, and Agence France-Presse, and a few private entities were also allowed to subscribe.

Through the old mail system, it also maintained a news exchange agreement with foreign news agencies such as Antara of Indonesia, Bernama of Malaysia, Kyodo of Japan, Yonhap of South Korea, Central News Agency of Taiwan, and TASS of the former Soviet Union, among several others.

When President Marcos declared martial law on September 23, 1972, the PNS was forced to cease its 24-hour daily operations since its major clients– newspapers, radio, and television stations–were padlocked and guarded by government troops. At the time of its closure, the PNS had some 120 news correspondents from all provinces and cities of the country.

Establishment 

About four months after the imposition of martial law, Marcos allowed a handful of newspapers and broadcast outfits to reopen. A group of former newspaper editors asked then the Department of Public Information (DPI) Secretary and later on Senator Francisco S. Tatad to explore the possibility of opening a government news agency by acquiring the World War II-vintage teletype machines and other equipment of the PNS.

The persistence of such a group of editors to once again set up an even more dynamic wire news agency bore fruit when PNS was allowed to reopen but under a new name – Philippines News Agency (PNA) as the government’s official news outfit.

Negotiations for the acquisition of the PNS equipment were done by a group of former newspapermen from Tatad’s office at Malacañang, including the late Bureau of National and Foreign Information (BNFI) Director Lorenzo J. Cruz and the late Press Undersecretary Amante Bigornia.

Jose L. Pavia, the late former executive editor of the defunct Philippines Herald, was appointed as the first general manager of the infant news agency. He headed its initial 11-member staff, with the late Renato B. Tiangco as managing editor; and Severino C. Samonte as national and provincial news editor.

As the government news agency, PNA was created under a Special Department Order issued by Tatad under the BNFI, its first mother bureau that provided its fund.

The PNA was launched on March 1, 1973, as the national government’s official news agency. The agency initially used the editorial offices vacated by the PNS on the second floor of the National Press Club (NPC) of the Philippines Bldg. along Magallanes Drive in Intramuros, Manila.

When Secretary Tatad turned on the switch to launch the PNA in the afternoon of March 1, 1973, in Malacañang, he said: “The Philippines News Agency will be operated in the best tradition of the world’s professional news agencies.”

During the martial law years, the PNA, together with the so-called “Big Four” news agencies – Reuters, AFP, AP, and UPI – covered the entire archipelago, bringing news around the Philippines to the outside world as much as possible. In a while, PNA even entered into a news exchange agreement with some of these foreign news agencies.

Expansion 

A year after its birth, PNA inaugurated its first domestic bureau in Cebu City, the country’s second-largest, most cosmopolitan city. In the year 1974, PNA opened its bureaus in Iloilo, Baguio, Davao, San Fernando, Pampanga; Cagayan de Oro, Bacolod, and Dagupan. Then followed by Lucena City, Legazpi, Cotabato, Tacloban, Zamboanga, Dumaguete, Iligan, Laoag, Tuguegarao, San Fernando, La Union; even Jolo, Sulu; and Los Baños, Laguna.

The peak number of domestic bureaus stood at 23 in 1975, with the opening of additional bureaus in Cabanatuan City, General Santos City, and Tagbilaran City. However, this number of bureaus was reduced drastically as a result of cost-cutting measures in later years.

Post-EDSA 

Until early 1986, the PNA, through the former Office of Media Affairs (OMA) headed by then Information Minister Gregorio S. Cendana, had overseas bureaus in San Francisco, California; Sacramento, Los Angeles, New York, Washington, D.C., Chicago, Toronto (Canada), Sydney (Australia) and Jeddah. These were closed down after the EDSA Revolution.

During the government reorganization in 1987, the BNFI was abolished and replaced with two new bureaus–the present-day News and Information Bureau (NIB) and the Bureau of Communications Services (BCS).

Present 

The Philippine News Agency remains a division of the News and Information Bureau. The agency is an attached agency of the Presidential Communications and Operations Office (PCOO).

PNA Newsroom notable people
William Thio
Marita Moaje
Rom Dulfo
Stephanie Sevillano

References

External links

News agencies based in the Philippines
Presidential Communications Group (Philippines)
Philippine companies established in 1973
Mass media companies established in 1973